Mark Mom is a Papua New Guinean rugby league footballer who represented Papua New Guinea in the 2000 World Cup.

Playing career
Mom attended St John's College, Woodlawn in Australia and played for the Australian Schoolboys' side.

In 1994 he played for the Papua New Guinea side at the 1994 World Sevens.

Between 1996 and 2001 he played eight test matches for the Kumuls, including four at the 2000 World Cup.

References

Living people
Papua New Guinean rugby league players
Papua New Guinean sportsmen
Papua New Guinea national rugby league team players
Place of birth missing (living people)
1974 births
Rugby league five-eighths
Rugby league locks
Rugby league halfbacks
Rugby league hookers
Papua New Guinean emigrants to Australia